The "Welcome To Video" case was a case in which roughly 1.28 million members from 38 countries traded sexually exploitative videos of children through the Welcome to Video website. 360,000 downloads are known to have been made through the website. The first case was in South Korea, where a criminal suspect was found using the Darknet. 

Son Jung-woo, a Korean operator, was scheduled to be released from prison on April 27, 2020, but his release was delayed due to a U.S. demand for the repatriation of criminals, and Jung-woo was released on July 6. Through international cooperation and investigations across 38 countries, 337 people were arrested on charges of possessing child pornography.

Case 
Son Jung-woo purchased "Welcome to Video" in July 2015, operating a server from his home in Chungcheongnam-do until March 2018. He distributed 220,000 sexually exploitative videos featuring children for over two years. Many of these videos were purchased using cryptocurrency, totaling 415 Bitcoin - roughly 400 million won. 

Jung-woo had downloaded videos of child sexual exploitation from child sexual abuse material distribution site AVSNOO, re-uploading them to his own server. Users were also able to trade video uploads for points on the site, encouraging them to add their own material. Forty-five percent of the videos on the site had not been encountered previously by investigators. There were 1.28 million known users, and 4,000 paid members. Over 360,000 downloads were made from "Welcome To Video" during its operation.

Progress of the investigation and trial

Start of international cooperation investigation 
The first organization to investigate Welcome To Video was the Internal Revenue Service. The IRS found transactions made with cryptocurrency on pornography sharing sites, and asked the Homeland Security Investigations for cooperation in their work. This collaboration revealed that the website was operating from South Korea. Following this, the HSI delivered related information to the Korean National Police Agency, leading to the arrest of Son Jung-woo. Investigators found that the Welcome to Video servers were poorly secured, allowing them to identify and trace Bitcoin payments to those who made them and to determine the location of the server.

Prosecution of Son Jung-woo in South Korea

Arrest and charge, first trial 
Son Jung-woo was arrested in March 2018. In May 2018, Son was sent to the prosecution on arrest charges. His charges included receiving roughly 400 million won in cryptocurrency from 4,000 paid members, providing them with 3,055 articles of child pornography. In addition, 156 Korean citizens were charged with possession of child pornography. Many of the charged were unmarried men in their 20s, including office workers and college students. Others charged were doctors, civil servants, and school teachers. One user had a history of child sex crimes, and had access to roughly 48,000 articles of child pornography.

Son reportedly appointed seven lawyers through a law firm. With Son in custody, the first trial court sentenced Son to two years in prison and three years of probation for violating 'ACT ON THE PROTECTION OF CHILDREN AND YOUTH AGAINST SEX OFFENSES' and 'ACT ON PROMOTION OF INFORMATION AND COMMUNICATIONS NETWORK UTILIZATION AND INFORMATION PROTECTION, ETC'. Judge Choi Mi-bok of the Seoul Central District Court said in a ruling that "the defendant's crimes are harmful to society." However, she said, "He is young and has no criminal history, and he is reflecting on himself," citing that the pornography on the W2V site was not only posted by Son, but also by other members as a reason for the sentencing.

Second trial and sentence confirmed 
As a result, Son left the detention center in six months, registering his marriage in April 2019 in the midst of the second trail.

Son was helped by a public defender during the second trial. He appealed to the second trial court, stating that he had a family to support.

In May 2019, the second trial court sentenced him to one and a half years in prison, stating "Acts such as selling child pornography for a large profit for a long time can distort the perception of children sexually.". Profits from cryptocurrency were also confiscated.

Examination of criminal extradition warrant 
In April 2020, the Ministry of Justice requested a criminal extradition warrant for Son through the Seoul Supreme Prosecutors' Office. On April 20, the Seoul High Court issued the warrant. The final delivery to the U.S. Department of Justice will be decided within two months after a court hearing. On April 27, the expiration date of Son's sentence, the Seoul Supreme Prosecutors' Office executed an extradition warrant for him, who was in prison at the Seoul Detention Center. As a result, he was not released despite the expiration of his arrest on 27 April.

On April 11, Son's father filed a complaint with the Seoul Central District Prosecutors' Office on charges of concealing criminal proceeds. This is an application of charges that the prosecution has not previously indicted.

On May 1, Son asked the Seoul High Court to reconsider whether the arrest warrant for extradition issued to him was appropriate through the review of legality for confinement. The interrogation process was terminated on May 3, and the claim was dismissed on May 4, citing concern of escape.

The first interrogation of the extradition judgment against Son took place on May 19. Without a conclusion, further questioning decided whether to deliver. On the same day, Son was not present day. The second interrogation date on June 16 also did not decide whether to repatriate, and the court said it would decide during further interrogation on July 6. On that day, Son was present and stated his opinion.

Outcome from the international cooperation investigation 
According to the announcement of the Korean National Police Agency and the U.S. Department of Justice on October 16, 2019, investigative agencies from 38 countries, including the Korean National Police Agency, the U.S. Homeland Security Investigations, the Internal Revenue Service, the U.S. Attorney's Office, the UK National Crime Agency, and the German District Attorney's Office, jointly investigated the dark web homepage run by Koreans. The number of arrests is 310 from 32 countries (Korea National Police Agency announced), or 337 from 38 countries (U.S. Department of Justice announced, UK, Ireland, US, South Korea, Germany, Spain, Saudi Arabia, the United Arab Emirates, Czech Republic, Canada, etc.). Among them, 223 Koreans accounted for 72 percent of the total.

United States 
Americans convicted and sentenced for their roles in the case include:
 Nicholas Stengel of Washington D.C., was sentenced to 15 years in prison in October 2018 for downloading 2,686 videos from the site. 
 Richard Gratkowski, a former HSI agent, pleaded guilty and was sentenced in May 2019 to 70 months in prison. Gratkowski appealed his conviction by claiming the investigation violated his Fourth Amendment rights, but an appeals court ruled that cryptocurrency transactions are not protected.
 Stephen P. Langlois, an Army veteran residing in Rhode Island, was sentenced in May 2019 to 42 months in prison for downloading 114 videos from the site. 

The U.S. Department of Justice asked the Government of South Korea to repatriate Son based on the extradition treaty. Under U.S. law, possession of child pornography alone carries a sentence of up to five years in prison. It is known that repatriation is under discussion, but the repatriation was canceled after a Korean court ruled on July 6 that it would not be allowed to be repatriated.

United Kingdom 
The UK National Crime Agency has released the names and faces of users of the website. Matthew Falder, a Cambridge-educated geophysical researcher at the University of Birmingham, was arrested on 21 June 2017 and sentenced to 25 years in prison. Kyle Fox was sentenced to 22 years in prison for uploading a video of a 5-year-old boy and a 3-year-old girl being sexually assaulted to the site.

Hungary 
Gábor Kaleta, the Hungarian ambassador to Peru pleaded guilty after he was found to have downloaded over 19,000 images from the site. He was flown home in complete secrecy in March 2019, after the American investigators identified him; the Hungarian public learned about the case only in February 2020. In July 2020 Kaleta was sentenced to a fine of 540,000 forints (~1500 EUR) and one year in prison, suspended for two years. The sentence has widely been considered too lenient, with major public figures calling it outrageous, unacceptable and "basically an acquittal". Governing party Fidesz reacted with Lex Kaleta, a law intended to fight pedophilia. The new law was criticised by human rights groups for lumping together pedophilia with homosexuality and transsexuality.

Aftermath 
The light sentence given to Son angered many in South Korea, which grew in 2020 when Son filed to annul his marriage after claiming a need to support a "family" as an argument for a lenient sentence. In September 2020, the country's Supreme Court ruled that producers of child pornography could be sentenced to up to 29 years in prison.

In July 2022, Son was sentenced to 24 months in prison for concealing his financial proceeds from the Welcome to Video operation and for using some of those proceeds for online gambling.

References 

Child pornography crackdowns
Child pornography websites
2018 in international relations
Cybercrime in South Korea
2018 in South Korea
2018 crimes in South Korea
Dark web